Anabasis medogia is a species of snout moth. It was described by Hou-Hun Li and Ying-Dang Ren in 2010. It is found in Tibet, China.

References

Moths described in 2010
Phycitinae